Charles Coote, 1st Earl of Bellomont KB PC(I) (6 April 1738 – 20 October 1800), was an Irish peer. He held a senior political position as one of the joint Postmasters General of Ireland. Charles was briefly styled as The 5th Baron Coote between February 1766 and his elevation to the earldom in September 1767.

Life
Charles was the son of Charles Coote MP (1695–1750) and Prudence Geering of Cootehill, County Cavan.  He was born on 6 April 1738 and baptised six days later. He was educated at Trinity College, Dublin.

Lord Bellomont, as he then was, was badly wounded while fighting a duel with The Viscount Townshend on 2 February 1773: Townshend shot him in the groin. The quarrel seems to have been political, as Townshend had been a highly unpopular Lord Lieutenant of Ireland.

Coote was the representative for County Cavan in the Irish House of Commons from 1761–66. He succeeded as The 5th Baron Coote in February 1766, and was created Earl of Bellomont in September 1767.

He married Lady Emily Maria Margaret FitzGerald, the daughter of The 1st Duke of Leinster and Emily, Duchess of Leinster, in Blackrock on 20 August 1774. The couple had five children: one son, Charles, who died in 1786, and four daughters, Mary, Prudentia, Emily and Louisa.

Between 1789 and 1797, Lord Bellomont was one of the joint Postmasters General of Ireland with The 1st Marquess of Ely.

His titles became extinct at his death.

Speeches

References

External links
 Joshua Reynolds painting details and Coote biography National Gallery of Ireland

1738 births
1800 deaths
Irish MPs 1761–1768
Earls in the Peerage of Ireland
Knights Companion of the Order of the Bath
Members of the Privy Council of Ireland
British duellists
Politicians from County Cavan
Members of the Parliament of Ireland (pre-1801) for County Carlow constituencies
Alumni of Trinity College Dublin